Jiří Černoch (born September 1, 1996) is a Czech professional ice hockey player. He is currently playing for HC Karlovy Vary of the Czech Extraliga (ELH).

Černoch made his Czech Extraliga debut playing with HC Sparta Praha during the 2014–15 Czech Extraliga season.

Career statistics

International

References

External links

1996 births
Living people
HC Baník Sokolov players
HC Benátky nad Jizerou players
Czech ice hockey centres
HC Karlovy Vary players
People from Klatovy
HC Sparta Praha players
Sportspeople from the Plzeň Region